The 2007–08 Biathlon World Cup – World Cup 3 was the third event of the season and was held in Pokljuka, Slovenia, from December 13 until December 16, 2007.

Schedule of events

Medal winners

Men

Women

References

3
December 2007 sports events in Europe
World Cup - World Cup 3,2007-08
2007 in Slovenian sport